Francis Frank Hanley (April 5, 1909 – January 23, 2006) was a Canadian politician of Irish descent from Montreal.

Background

Frank Hanley was born on April 5, 1909, in Montreal.  He was the son of John Hanley, brewer, and Stella Johnson and attended St. Ann's Boys School in Montreal.  Prior to his political career, he had been a boxer, a jockey and a city public servant.  He also served as President of the St. Ann's Community Council. In 1945 the United Irish Societies of Montreal named him the Grand Marshal of the St. Patrick's Parade.

Hanley served simultaneously as a City Councillor in Montreal and as a Member of the Legislative Assembly of Quebec.

Frank Hanley married Noreen (Hanorah) Mines in 1934 and they remained married for more than sixty years.

Municipal politics

Hanley ran as an Independent candidate to the Montreal City Council in the district of Sainte-Anne in 1940, and he won. He was re-elected in 1942, 1944, 1947, 1950, 1954, 1957, 1960, 1962, and 1966, but he did not run for re-election in 1970.

Provincial politics

Hanley ran as an Independent candidate to the legislature in the district of Montréal–Sainte-Anne against Liberal incumbent Thomas Guérin in 1948, and he won. He was re-elected in 1952, 1956, 1960, and 1962; he was elected in Sainte-Anne in 1966. He was defeated by Liberal George Springate in 1970 and 1973.

Federal politics

He also ran as an Independent candidate to the House of Commons of Canada in the district of St. Henri in 1972, but he lost. At one point, he was President of the Progressive Conservative organization in Montreal.

Death

He died on January 23, 2006, in Montreal at the age of 96.

Electoral record (partial)

References

1909 births
2006 deaths
Canadian people of Irish descent
Quebec people of Irish descent
Montreal city councillors
Anglophone Quebec people
Independent MNAs in Quebec
Independent candidates in the 1972 Canadian federal election